Haunted State is an American documentary television series created by Michael Brown released on Amazon Prime Video. Michael Brown serves as showrunner and is the executive producer along with producer Angela Olson. The series premiered on Amazon Prime Video on March 19, 2019. Set in Wisconsin, the first season focuses on the loss of family members and the ability to communicate with them after they die. Each episode centers on a location in Wisconsin that has paranormal claims and rich history surrounding those claims. A paranormal investigation is conducted and is backed by parapsychologist, Loyd Auerbach. The cast includes four filmmakers, Michael Brown, Angela Olson, Todd Dehring & Anne Benson. The series has become an underground hit for Amazon Prime Video and in May 2020, it was announced that the series would return for a second season.

The series franchise launched with the 2014 film, Haunted State: Whispers From History Past and followed up by the second film, Haunted State: Theatre of Shadows in 2017. The Haunted State title comes from the claim Robert E. Gard (the founder of the Wisconsin Idea Theatre) made that "Wisconsin has the most ghosts per square mile. It is the most Haunted State".

Episodes

Season 1 (2019-2020)

Distribution 
  on Amazon Prime Video

International 
Haunted State is currently on air at the following countries and channels:

  on Amazon Prime Video
  on Amazon Prime Video
  on Amazon Prime Video
  on Amazon Prime Video
  on Amazon Prime Video
  on Amazon Prime Video
  on Amazon Prime Video
  on Amazon Prime Video
  on Amazon Prime Video
  on Amazon Prime Video
  on Amazon Prime Video
  on Amazon Prime Video
  on Amazon Prime Video
  on Amazon Prime Video
  on Amazon Prime Video
  on Amazon Prime Video
  on Amazon Prime Video
  on Amazon Prime Video
  on Amazon Prime Video

References

External links 
 
 
 
 

2019 American television series debuts
2020 American television series endings
Paranormal reality television series